Al Khabr is a village in the Shabwah Governorate of southern Yemen, northeast of Ahwar and south of Ataq. The village is primarily agricultural, being located in a fertile river valley.

References

Populated places in Shabwah Governorate
Villages in Yemen